was a city located in Iwate Prefecture, Japan. It is currently part of the city of Ōshū. Mizusawa is home to one of the six International Latitude Observatories.  The observatories were close to the parallel of 39 degrees 8 minutes north latitude. They worked together to study the Earth's "wobble" using stars selected by Dr. Kimura, the astronomer in charge of the Mizusawa station. Twelve groups of stars that had six pairs of stars each were chosen. Two groups of stars were observed at each station following a schedule of dates, time, and duration prepared by Kimura.

The town of Mizusawa was created on April 1, 1889, with the establishment of the municipalities system. The city was founded on April 1, 1954 when Mizusawa Town merged with the neighboring villages of Anetai, Shinjo, Sakuragawa, Kuroishi and Haneda. On February 20, 2006, Mizusawa, along with the city of Esashi, the towns of Isawa and Maesawa, and the village of Koromogawa (all from Isawa District), was merged to create the city of Ōshū, and no longer exists as an independent municipality.

As of February 2006, the city had an estimated population of 60,239 and a population density of 621.53 persons per km2. The total area was 96.92 km2.

References

External links
 Ōshū official website 

Dissolved municipalities of Iwate Prefecture
Ōshū, Iwate